Amatory (commonly stylized as [AMATORY], to fit their logo) is a Russian metal band from Saint Petersburg, formed in 1998 by Denis [DENVER] Zhivotovsky and Daniil [STEWART] Svetlov.

Later in 1998, they were joined by Evgenyy PJ Potekhin but the official birthday of the band is April 1, 2001, when Sergey [GANG] Osechkin joined and the trio became a quartet.

They are considered to be among the pioneers of Russian alternative metal but their musical approach changed over the years.

Despite relatively little media exposure, Amatory has gained a huge following in a short time through their live performances in Russia, Eastern and Northern Europe, and Central Asia.

The band's current lineup comprises lead vocalist Sergei [RAEV] Raev, bassist Denis [DENVER] Zhivotovsky, rhythm guitarist/keyboardist Dmitriy [HELLDIMM] Muzychenko, lead guitarist/vocalist Ilya [EEL] Borisov and drummer Daniil [STEWART] Svetlov.

At the moment they have released 7 full-length studio albums, 2 instrumental albums and 7 (including 4 instrumental) EPs.

History

1998–2001: Early years

[AMATORY] founders Denis [DENVER] Zhivotovsky (Russian: Денис Животовский) and Daniil [STEWART] Svetlov (Russian: Даниил Светлов) met at the age of 13 in the spring of 1998. They have been hanging out and skateboarding in the courtyard of the block of flats where they both were living at the time.

Initial rehearsals were held that same spring in Svetlov's apartment, they played snippets of their favorite songs by Nirvana, Sex Pistols, The Exploited, and a self-penned song by Zhivotovsky.

In the autumn of 1998 a mutual acquittance set them up with Evgenyy PJ Potekhin who was older, more skilled and had additional guitar gear including an amplifier and an effect pedal. He became the much-anticipated vocalist, the "real" guitarist, the songwriter and the conceptual leader of the newborn band. Zhivotovsky then left the guitar in favor of the bass.

Rehearsals were moved to Zhivotovsky's apartment because there was an empty bedroom to which Svetlov brought his drum set. The building itself was so called khrushchyovka (Russian: хрущевка) also known as krushcheby (Russian: хрущеба, Khrushchev-slum) – cheap, easy-to-build apartment blocks that were massively built all over the former Soviet Union from the late 1950s to the early 1980s. They are well known for their poor thermal and sound insulation. With this in mind the aspiring musicians covered with carpets the walls, the door and floor in their makeshift bedroom rehearsal space but it didn't work – the neighbours complained about the noise, regularly banged on the door and called the police.

The trio began performing live by covering Nirvana songs in a nearby school. In 1999 Potekhin and Zhivotovsky got carried away with Korn, but at the same time Svetlov became "addicted" to black metal and grindcore. He started to distance himself from his bandmates, therefore they did a little trick to get their drummer back – they began to write music in the grindcore style but little by little introduced the elements of alternative metal.

In the summer of 1999 they found a rehearsal space in a youth club called Rubin, consequently they should have introduced themselves. On that occasion PJ came up with the name for the band – he called it Amatory. The name itself is said to have come from an English – Russian dictionary and was chosen because it was in tune with Crematory, Obiatuary and Cemetary. With the new name they started to regularly play concerts in schools and underground clubs. In June 2000 Amatory performed at the Summer Bike Festival in Krasnoye Selo. Later in the same year, their first demo was recorded.

Gradually they realized that they needed a second guitarist, after a short search they found Sergey [GANG] Osechkin (Russian: Сергей Осечкин). The first rehearsal as a four-piece band took place on April 1, 2001 – that day became the band's official birth date.

With this line-up, Amatory played several concerts until June when unexpectedly for all of them Potekhin was drafted into the military service for two years. After losing their vocalist, songwriter and conceptual leader they decided to move on – [DENVER] took on the vocals and the writing of the lyrics, and [GANG] began composing music. Following the reassignment of duties within the band they recorded a new demo called "I Will Not Survive".

2001–2004: Fortune's Always Hiding (Вечно Прячется Судьба)

After the demo was recorded, Amatory decided to experiment with innovative musical approach. In September, 2001, Alexey Lexus Ovchinnikov (Russian: Алексей Овчинников), the school mate of [DENVER], joined the band and became their rapper. His recruitment played a large role in shaping the band's new sound.

In the spring of 2002 they also recruited Alexey Liolik Skornyakov who had AKAI S1100 – a professional sampler from the late eighties. It diversified their new rap/metal approach with electronic sound.

The team recorded an EP called The Bread" (Russian: Хлеб) together with SPERMADONARZ (a joint project of the musicians from the bands Кирпичи and Animal Jazz). It was released on double-sided cassettes by the independent record label Caravan Records in November 2002, with Amatory at the A-side and SPERMADONARZ at the B-side.

A concert in support of "The Bread" was scheduled on November 26, 2002, in a new club "Orlandina". All the bandmates were there on time except of Liolik who had mysteriously disappeared. Later they found out that Liolik was on his way to the club when he was stopped by a police patrol to verify his documents and unexpectedly was drafted into the military service for two years following PJ. In this way Amatory lost their second musician because of the Russian armed forces.

In 2003, though limited in resources, the band began recording their debut studio album. In April they released a single entitled "Fragments" (Russian: Осколки)  which is regarded as one of their signature songs.

The album titled Fortune's Always Hiding (Russian: Вечно Прячется Судьба) with Denver and Lexus on vocals was released on November 14, 2003. It was named after one of the songs that was inspired by Irvine Welsh's novella Fortune's Always Hiding from his trilogy Ecstasy: Three Tales of Chemical Romance. In an interview to "In search of Titans" (Russian: В поисках Титанов) Ovchinnikov remembers writing and correcting the lyrics together with Zhivotovsky in the school during the classes, and recording the vocals in a closet (because they had no money to book a record studio).

Shortly before the album's release Alexander [ALEX] Pavlov (Russian: Александр Павлов) became the second guitarist of the band.

2004—2006: Inevitability (Неизбежность)

On March 14, 2004, Amatory released a maxi-single entitled "Two Lives" (Russian: Две Жизни). Shortly beforehand Ovchinnikov left the band and his place was taken by the guitarist of Stigmata – Igor [IGOR] Kapranov (Russian: Игорь Капранов). For the single's artwork they invented to place the name of the band and their pseudonyms in square brackets to fit their logo. This stylization became [AMATORY]'s hallmark.
Following the release the team immediately took up work on new material in collaboration with Danish producer Jacob Hansen (Amaranthe, Volbeat, Epica). Through working with Jacob, Amatory began to play "in a western manner". Despite the fact that [IGOR] joined the band as the vocalist he was never singing before consequently almost all growling parts for an upcoming album were recorded by [DENVER].

The second studio album titled Inevitability (Russian: Неизбежность) with [DENVER] and [IGOR] on vocals was released on October 14. Shortly thereafter [IGOR], according to the statement of the FUZZ magazine, became the voice of a generation.

At the time of the album's release [ALEX] was twenty two years old, [GANG] was twenty one, [DENVER] was twenty, [STEWART] was nineteen, and [IGOR] was only eighteen. In November, 2004, "Inevitability" entered the top five of the best-selling rock albums in Russia, a few months later it received the FUZZ People's Choice Award 2005. After such a resounding success the band was invited to perform at major Russian festivals.

In 2004, [AMATORY] together with the bands Psychea and Jane Air, formed the "Spb (short for Saint Petersburg) Music" coalition. In the following years they were also performing on joint tours with some other bands from Saint Petersburg.

On February 6, 2005 the band released a single "Black and White Days" (Russian: Черно-Белые Дни) which was dedicated to Dimebag Darrell of the bands Pantera and Damageplan, who was shot and killed on stage by a deranged fan during a concert in December 2004.

In early 2005, the band released their first DVD titled [P]ost [S]criptum, consisted of home videos recorded by themselves, their crew and friends during the tour in support of the album "Inevetability". It provided an insight into the band's life on tour, their experiences and adventures on the road and during the shows.

In September 2005, [AMATORY] supported Korn in Saint Petersburg and Moscow. At the same time "Black and White Days" won RAMP 2005 (Russian Alternative Music Prize) for "Best Music Video" and [AMATORY] won the "Best Band" category.

2006—2008: Book Of The Dead (Книга Мертвых)

In the spring of 2006, during the "Rock 5 Tour", Sergey [GANG] Osechkin suddenly felt severe pain in his right side. In the summer of the same year, when the band was working with Hansen on new material, he felt unwell. In October Amatory went on their largest tour to date called Live Evil with session guitarist Nikolai "Niky" Yuriev (Russian: Николай Юрьев) of the band "Perimeter" due to the grave health situation of Osechkin.

The third album titled Book of the Dead (Russian: Книга Мертвых) was released on Friday the 13th, in October 2006. Five days later, right before the band's performance as an opening act for Stone Sour, they got the news that [GANG] was diagnosed with liver cancer. Osechkin passed away at the age of 23 on March 15, 2007, and was buried with his first guitar Jackson, given to him by his grandmother, at the Memorial cemetery to the Victims of 9 January in Saint Petersburg.  On the album "6" (2015) there is a song dedicated to him, titled "15/03".

Later the band's members many times described that period as the worst time in Amatory's history. They decided to move on but it was a difficult decision. According to [STEWART], they sank into heavy drinking for a time, and it was their session guitarist Niky Yuriev who kept them from getting depressed during the first leg of the Live Evil tour.
Simultaneously with the tragedy that has hit the band, the year 2007 marked their breakthrough towards a mass audience. According to one of the largest Russian newspapers Rossiyskaya Gazeta, Amatory became a phenomenon and "a dictator of fashion" on the Russian music scene with playing a huge number of sold-out shows throughout the country despite the lack of media support. Around this time the band also gained a following outside of Russia and ex-USSR countries – they received many fan mails from Latin America, Europe, Indonesia, etc.
 
In the spring of 2007, Amatory went on the second leg of the Live Evil tour with session guitarist Ivan Ludewig (Russian: Иван Людевиг, ex-Kirpichi). On April 26, 2007, the band did a sold-out show at the Yubileyny Sports Palace, it was filmed and later released as the concert DVD+CD "Live Evil". By summer they played several concerts as a four-piece while looking for a new guitarist. At the same time [AMATORY] was invited to perform with Linkin Park in Moscow and Saint Petersburg but they made a choice in favor of their sold-out gig in Moscow and a benefit concert in memory of Sergey Osechkin – all funds raised went to his family and the installation of a memorial.

In September the band went on Saint Seventh Tour with new session guitarist Dmitry Rubanovsky. During the tour the internet TV channel Nashe TV filmed a 17-episode series called "AMATORY in your city" (Russian: AMATORY в твоем городе) showing what it's like for them their concert and day-to-day life on tour.

On September 19, 2007, a live music video Butterfly Effect (Russian: Эффект Бабочки) from the upcoming DVD Live Evil was released. Also in 2007 [AMATORY] released their second DVD EVol.01 made of home videos filmed during their tours since May 2005.

2008—2010: VII

In the beginning of 2008, ESP Guitars together with the band's guitarist Alexander [ALEX] Pavlov created a signature guitar named ESP LTD [A – 600] – it became the first signature guitar awarded to a Russian guitarist. On March 20, the DVD+CD Live Evil, mixed and mastered by Jacob Hansen at Hansen Studios in Denmark, was released. 
On April 5, [AMATORY] received the FUZZ Award in the "Best Alternative Band" category.

In September 2008, their session guitarist Dmitry [JAY] Rubanovsky became the band's new guitarist and principal music writer. In October, Nashe TV started broadcasting a mini-series filmed during the recording sessions for the upcoming album. It provided an insight into the creation of new songs in collaboration with Danish producer Tue Madsen, known for his work with Meshuggah, Dark Tranquility, Suicide Silence, etc. With Madsen the band recorded a Russian and an English version at the same time but eventually the English version was not released.

In November, [AMATORY] released a single Breathe with me (Russian: Дыши Со Мной) and signed a contract with the music label FG Nikitin. This song got in heavy rotation on the radio in Russia and some neighbouring countries, it stayed seven weeks at number one surpassing The Prodigy and Depeche Mode. In 2009 it won the Rock Alternative Music Prize for "Best Song". Together with the huge popularity Breathe with me also caused some confusion and erroneous plagiarism charges because Rubanovsky wrote the music and the lyrics in English when he was a member of his first band "Tearfall", his next band "Horizon 8" recorded the second version. When Rubanovsky joined Amatory they decided to give a new life to this old song and it became the third version with the lyrics in Russian written by Zhivotovsky.

On November 7, 2008, [AMATORY] released their fourth studio album titled VII. It became their first album with [JAY] and earned rave reviews from many critics and an extremely negative response from many fans. Following the release, the band went on Sold Out Tour with a new approach – they focused on the quality of shows and took on the tour their own equipment. It resulted in more expensive tickets and coincided with general financial situation in Russia due to the financial crisis of 2007-2008 – the concert attendance has fallen markedly in all parts of the country.

In April 2009, NTV showed a TV report about the band, underlining that they became iconic without producers and mainstream media support. A little later Daniil Svetlov became "Drummer Of The Year" ("Musician" magazine awards).

On October 27, 2009, the band released an internet single Crimson Dawn (Russian: Багровый Рассвет) mixed by American producer Chris Zeuss Harris.

2010—2012: Instinct Of The Doomed (Инстинкт Обреченных)

In March 2010, Amphora Publishers (Russian: Издательство Амфора) published a hard cover book "Black and White Days. The truth about [AMATORY]" (Russian: Черно-Белые Дни. Вся правда о группе [AMATORY])" written by the music journalist Aleksey Kuzovlev (Russian: Алексей Кузовлев). The book tells about the band’s early days, thorny way to the overwhelming success, and contains many exclusive interviews with [DENVER], [IGOR], [ALEX], [STEWART] and [JAY] taken over two and a half years.

On July 4, 2010, the band performed at Tuska Open Air. Two weeks later, on July 28, at the height of [AMATORY]’s fame, Igor Kapranov (aged 23) announced that he is quitting music and going to devote himself to religion. For the band and the fans this was a complete surprise which caused a storm in the music media and a large number of discussions. Following that announcement, [IGOR] spent a year in the orthodox Valaam Monastery (Russian: Валаамский монастырь). Thereafter he joined [AMATORY] for a brief time as the special guest on the occasion of the band’s tenth anniversary and then he was singing solely in a church choir for several years.

Kapranov departed the group a month before the start of recording sessions for an upcoming album – the second one in collaboration with Tue Madsen. New material for the album was ready, a record studio was booked, the airplane tickets to Saint Petersburg for Madsen were bought, consequently the band had to find a new vocalist in an extremely short time. On October 6, 2010, they premiered a single titled "Through Closed Eyelids" (Russian: Сквозь Закрытые Веки). The new singer was revealed to be Vyacheslav [SLAVA] Sokolov of The Wheels Of Sorrow (ex- Such A Beautiful Day).

The fifth studio album Instinct of the Doomed (Russian: Инстинкт Обреченных) with [DENVER] and [SLAVA] on vocals was released on October 24.

In June 2011, [AMATORY] joined Slipknot as the special guest at their show at the Olympic Stadium (Moscow). Then, on the occasion of the band's tenth anniversary, the band goes on the "X Anniversary Tour" with their new vocalist [SLAVA] and former vocalist [IGOR] as the special guest. Before the tour, they released the internet single "Fragments 2.011" (Russian: Осколки 2.011). Later in the same year, Dmitry [JAY] Rubanovsky left the band.

In 2012, Ilya [K] Kukhin (ex – Such A Beautiful Day, The Wheels Of Sorrow) was officially announced as the new guitarist. With him [AMATORY] released three singles – Three Stripes (Russian: Три Полоски) ft. Animal Jazz, Believe Me (Russian: Верь Мне) and The Moment Of Truth (Russian: Момент Истины).

On June 13, 2012, [AMATORY] announced upcoming suspension of its activities, saying this on the official website where the band explained this decision by the fact that the musicians were not able to go on long tours. In the same news, they announced a tour called "The Last Concert?" (Russian: Последний Концерт?)/"Never Say Never". Thereafter Alexander [ALEX] Pavlov left the band and was replaced for the tour by session guitarist Ilya [EEL] Borisov (Russian: Илья Борисов), who later became a permanent member of the band. On September 8, 2012, the band released their second concert DVD "The X-Files: Live In Saint-P & On The Road 2011–2012".

On January 1, 2013, after the end of "Never Say Never"/"The Last Concert?" tour, [AMATORY] went on hiatus.

2014—2018: 6 

In the beginning of 2013 [STEWART] got carried away with electronic music. He co-founded a trap music (EDM)/bass electronic project called "FatSound Brothers" together with Dmitriy Muzychenko (Russian: Дмитрий Музыченко; ex-Naily) and Taras Umansky (Russian: Тарас Уманский) from Stigmata.  Under this project Muzychenko wrote some music compositions that later laid a basis for a new [AMATORY]'s album.

In 2014 the band performed a few concerts at festivals without official return from their hiatus.

In the beginning of 2015 [AMATORY] resumed its activities after Dmitriy [HELLDIMM] Muzychenko replaced Ilya [K] Kukhin and became the principal music writer in the band. With his arrival their music got a more electronic-oriented sound.

On January 30, 2015, the team performed a new song called "Stop The Time" (Russian: Остановить Время) at the Stars Fucktory Festival, it was released as a single on June 15, 2015. Four days later a music video for this song was premiered on the official Amatorytube YouTube channel.

On October 6, 2015, [AMATORY] released their sixth studio album titled 6 with [SLAVA] on vocals. The band had been working on new material for two years, experimenting with different sounds until they felt they are onto something worthwhile. This album received very mixed reactions from the fans because the band had changed its musical style and at the same time it became their first record without [DENVER] on vocals. However at the moment « 6 » stands as [AMATORY]'s most commercially successful album.

On March 15, 2016, they released a studio music video for the song "15/03" dedicated to Sergey [GANG] Osechkin, the band's guitarist and music writer on the albums Fortune's Always Hiding, Inevitability and Book of the Dead, who died of liver cancer at the age of 23 on March 15, 2007.

A week later the band premiered a neo-noir music video for the song "The First" (Russian: Первый).

On October 12, 2016, [AMATORY] released their third EP Fire (Russian: Огонь). It consisted of three tracks, one of which was recorded with Russian rapper ATL.

Since the summer of 2017, the band toured through Russia with a new approach – the fans could suggest a song and vote for a concert set list.

In December 2017, [AMATORY] collaborated with Russian rapper Bumble Beezy at the Jager Music Awards. This collaboration resulted in a maxi-single "Original Go Getter/Original Go Getter (Rock Version)" released in March 2018.

On March 11, 2018, Vyacheslav Sokolov was dismissed from the band because of his unprofessional behaviour and heavy drinking problem. The last straw was the participation of Slava in TV project The Songs on TNT (Russian: Песни на ТНТ) where he did not act correctly towards the band.

2019 — present: DOOM

On March 29, 2019, [AMATORY] unexpectedly released a single "Space Kamikaze" (Russian: Космо-камикадзе) with a new incognito vocalist, whose face was covered by a mask. The inspiration behind this song arose from their discontent with the political climate in Russia.

On July 5, a second single titled "The Knife" (Russian: Нож), recorded together with Russian rapper Dirty "RAM" Ramirez, was released and a lyrics video for this song appeared on the official Amatorytube YouTube channel. A few days later the band announced a live broadcast on VKontakte and posted another photo with the new singer, now without a mask. Many guesses were confirmed – Sergei Raev (a member of Obscure of Acacia, Triumphant, also known for working with Shokran and Sumatra) became the new vocalist of the band.

The seventh studio album DOOM with Sergei [RAEV] and Ilya [EEL] Borisov on vocals was released on October 18, 2019. It is a concept album with cold sombre atmosphere, dealing with dark side of human nature such as gluttony, greed, sloth, etc. and dangerous actions that lead to global disasters. An imaginary hero of the album wanders around "post-apocalyptic zones" – aftermaths of catastrophes that happened in real life. The songs deal with sensitive topics: Cherno (Russian: Черно) is dedicated to the Chernobyl disaster, it was inspired by the HBO miniseries Chernobyl; Locusts (Russian: Саранча) was inspired by the major wildfires in Russia and across the globe that have shaken the world in 2019; Angel 141 (Russian: Ангел 141) is dedicated to the Russian submarine Kursk (K-141) (Russian: Атомная Подводная Лодка "Курск") that sank in the Barents Sea on August 12, 2000, killing all 118 personnel on board. A music video for the song "Star Dust" was filmed with the participation of the fans of the band, it was released on November 5, 2019.

After the "DOOM tour" Amatory announced two concerts with guest musicians on the occasion of the band's 19th anniversary – on March 22 and April 3, 2020, but due to the COVID-19 pandemic they were moved to September 2020.

On April 17, 2020, the band released 2 instrumental albums: "The Unvoiced Pt. I (6 Instrumental)", "The Unvoiced Pt. III (DOOM Instrumental)", and an instrumental EP "The Unvoiced Pt. II ( Fire Instrumental)".

On June 26 of the same year, a single "Motherland" (Russian: Родина) under ONErpm's project "DDT Territory – a tribute to DDT" was released.

During DOOM sessions the band recorded 23 demos but only 10 of them were chosen under the concept of the album. On December 31, 2019, [AMATORY] announced a New Year song competition "We Play – You Sing" for writing the lyrics and the vocals to one of the instrumentals that was rejected from the album. The winning song entitled I Sing You Pay featuring Miroshland of the Belorussian metal band An Argency was released as a single on September 18, 2020.

In the beginning of 2021 Amatory announced some shows in an enlarged line-up with the participation of Igor [IGOR] Kapranov, Dmitry [JAY] Rubanovsky, Alex [ALEX] Pavlov and Aleksey [LEXUS] Ovchinnikov on the occasion of the band’s 20th anniversary. Evgeny Potekhin was unable to participate due to childbirth, Vyacheslav Sokolov declined the invitation.

In March the band released a single « Снег в Аду 2.021/Snow in Hell 2.021 » with [DENVER], [IGOR] and [RAEV] on vocals, [HELLDIMM], [ALEX], [JAY] and [EEL] on guitars, and [STEWART] on drums. On April 23, 2021, their sold-out show with this enlarged line-up was filmed and later released as a concert 3CD (audio only version) + digital video version « [AMATORY] ALL STARS : Live in Moscow ».

With the same line-up in the autumn of 2021 the band did 3 shows dedicated to the « Книга Мёртвых/Book of the Dead » 15th anniversary. During those shows they played all the songs from this album, some of them never were performed live before.

On January 28, 2022, [AMATORY] released a special anniversary edition of the album « Книга Мёртвых/Book of the Dead » which additionally includes unreleased tracks, remixes and instrumental versions of the songs.

Members 
Current
  Daniil [STEWART] Svetlov – drums (since 1998), samples, programming (2001–2012)
 Dmitriy [HELLDIMM] Muzychenko – guitars, keyboards, programming, samples (since 2015)
  Sergei [RAEV] Raev – lead vocals (since 2019)
    Ilya [EEL] Borisov – guitars (since 2012), additional vocals (since 2015), keyboards, programming, samples (since 2019)
   Denis [DENVER] Zhivotovsky – bass (since 1998), unclean vocals, clean vocals (since 2001)

Past
 Evgeniy "PJ" Potekhin – guitars, lead vocals (1998–2001)
 Aleksey "Liolik" Skornyakov – samples (2002)
 Aleksey "Lexus" Ovchinnikov – rapping vocals (2001–2004)
 Sergey [GANG] Osechkin – guitars ( 2001–2007 † )
 Igor [IGOR] Kapranov – unclean vocals, rapping vocals (2004–2010, 2011–2012, 2021 as a special guest on tour), samples (2004)
 Dmitriy [JAY] Rubanovskiy – guitars (2008–2011)
 Aleksandr [ALEX] Pavlov – guitars, keyboards, programming, samples (2003–2012)
 Ilya [K] Kukhin – guitars (2011–2014)
 Vyacheslav [SLAVA] Sokolov – lead vocals (2010–2018)

Timeline

Discography

Studio albums 

 2003 – Вечно Прячется Судьба (Fortune's Always Hiding)
 2004 – Неизбежность (Inevitability)
 2006 – Книга Мёртвых (Book of The Dead)
 2008 – VII
 2010 – Инстинкт Обречённых (Instinct of the Doomed)
 2015 – 6
 2019 – DOOM

Singles 

 2003 – Осколки (Fragments)
 2004 – Две Жизни (Two Lives)
 2005 – Чёрно-Белые Дни (Black and White Days)
 2006 – Преступление Против Времени (Crime Against Time)
 2007 – Слишком Поздно (Too Late)
 2008 – Вы Все Лишены Своей Жизни (The All of You are Deprived of Your Lives)
 2008 – Дыши Со Мной (Breathe with Me)
 2009 – Багровый Рассвет (Crimson Dawn)
 2010 – Сквозь Закрытые Веки (Through Closed Eyelids)
 2011 – Осколки 2.011 (Fragments 2.011)
 2012 – Три Полоски (The Three Stripes) (featuring Animal Jazz)
 2012 – Верь Мне (Believe Me)
 2012 – Момент Истины (The Moment of Truth)
 2015 – Остановить Время (Stop The Time)
 2018 – Original Go Getter/Original Go Getter (Rock Version) (featuring Bumble Beezy)
 2019 – Космо-камикадзе (Space Kamikadze)
 2019 – Нож (The Knife) (featuring RAM)
 2020 – Родина (Motherland), a tribute to DDT
 2020 – I Sing You Pay (featuring Miroshland)

Live albums 

 2008 – Live Evil
 2012 – The X-Files

Instrumental Albums 

 2020 – The Unvoiced Pt. I ("6" Instrumental)
 2020 – The Unvoiced Pt. III ("DOOM" Instrumental)

EP 

 2002 – Хлеб (The Bread) feat. SPERMADONARZ
 2006 – Discovery
 2016 – Огонь (Fire)

Instrumental EP 

 2009 – We Play – You Sing
 2010 – We Play – You Sing Pt. 2
 2011 – We Play – You Sing Pt. 3
 2020 – The Unvoiced Pt. II ("Fire" Instrumental)

DVD 

 2005 – [P]OST [S]CRIPTUM
 2007 – Home Video EVol. 01
 2008 – Live Evil
 2012 – The X-Files: Live In Saint-P & On The Road 2011–2012

Videos

Russian

2003: Осколки (Fragments)
2004: Чёрно-Белые Дни (Black and White Days)
2006: Преступление Против Времени (Crime Against Time)
2006: Преступление Против Времени (Alternative Version) (Crime Against Time (Alternative Version))
2007: Эффект Бабочки (Butterfly Effect)
2009: Дыши Со Мной (Breathe With Me)
2009: Багровый Рассвет (Crimson Dawn)
2011: Стеклянные Люди (Glass People)
2011: Сквозь Закрытые Веки (Through Closed Eyelids)
2011: Осколки 2.011 (Fragments 2.011)
2015: Остановить Время (Stop The Time)
 2016: Первый (The First)
 2019: Звёздная Грязь (Star Dust)

English

2009: Just One More Day (unofficial)
2009: Your Life In My Eyes (unofficial)

Concert tours 

Screamin and Growlin Tour (October 2004 — August 2005)
We Play You Die Tour (August 2005 — February 2006)
Discovery Tour (February — April 2006)
Rock 5 Tour (April — June 2006)
Escape from the Studio Tour (July — August 2006)
Live Evil Tour (October 2006 — August 2007)
Saint Seventh Tour (September 2007 — December 2008)
Sold Out Tour (February — August 2009)
Sick&Loud Tour (October — December 2009)
Инстинкт обречённых Tour (2010—2011)
X Anniversary Tour (September 2011 — March 2012)
Never Say Never Tour/The Last Concert? (September — December 2012)
6 Tour (September 2015 — January 2016)
15 лет вне времени (April — December 2016)
Best of the Best Show (October — November 2017)
Doom Tour (November — December 2019)

Awards

Russian Music Awards

 St. Petersburg Alternative Music Awards – 08.04.2005 : "Best music video for "Black and White Days"; "Best Album" for "Inevitability"
 FUZZ People's Choice Award – 09.04.2005 : "Best Band"
 RAMP (Russian Alternative Music Prize) 2005 : "Best Band", "Best Music Video" for "Black and White Days" – 22.09.2005
 FUZZ Award 2008 : "Best Alternative Band" 
 Metal Planet Awards – 15.06.2008 : People's Choice "Best Band"
 RAMP 2009 : "Best Song" for "Breathe With Me" – 29.10.2009

Literature 

 Алексеев А. С. Кто есть кто в российской рок-музыке. — М. : АСТ : Астрель : Харвест, 2009. — С. 52, 53. —  (АСТ). —  (Астрель). —  (Харвест).
 Кузовлев А. Чёрно-белые дни. Вся правда о группе [Amatory]. — СПб.: «Амфора», 2010. — 512 с. .

References

External links
Official site (in Russian)
Semiofficial international fan club. (in English, German, Spanish and Portuguese)
 Fan Club

Musical groups established in 2001
Musical groups from Saint Petersburg
Russian nu metal musical groups
Russian metalcore musical groups
2001 establishments in Russia
Russian alternative rock groups
Russian alternative metal musical groups
Electronic rock musical groups